Giannis Kotsiras (born 16 December 1992) is a Greek professional footballer who plays as a right-back for Super League club Panathinaikos and the Greece national team.

Club career
Panarkadikos

His senior footballing career began in Greece's local divisions when he signed for Doxa Megalopolis. He moved to AO Falesias in 2011, before making the switch in the summer of 2014, as he signed for Gamma Ethniki club Panarkadikos at the age of 21 playing 49 games as a winger and scoring 22 goals.

Asteras Tripolis

In 2016, Kotsiras signed for the Super League side Asteras Tripolis, a big step in his career. After five seasons with Asteras Tripolis he becomes one of the best defenders at Super League,  and at his last season with Asteras Tripolis the best right back at greek top division. 

Panathinaikos 

On 17 June 2021, he signed a three years' contract with Panathinaikos, for a transfer fee of €250.000.

International career
Kotsiras made his international debut for Greece on 30 May 2019 in a friendly match against Turkey, which finished as a 1–2 loss. He made his second appearance in a 2–3 home defeat against Armenia replacing an injured player in the first half and playing 73 minutes.

Career statistics

Club

International

Honours
Panathinaikos
Greek Cup: 2021–22
Individual
Super League Greece Team of the Year: 2020–21

References

External links
 
 
 
 

1992 births
Living people
Greek footballers
Greece international footballers
Association football defenders
Asteras Tripolis F.C. players
Panathinaikos F.C. players
Gamma Ethniki players
Super League Greece players
People from Megalopoli, Greece
Footballers from the Peloponnese